Jerome (Jerry) Ravetz is a philosopher of science.  He is best known for his books analysing scientific knowledge from a social and ethical perspective, focussing on issues of quality.  He is the co-author (with Silvio Funtowicz) of the NUSAP notational system and of Post-normal science.  He is currently an Associate Fellow at the Institute for Science, Innovation and Society, University of Oxford.

Life and work 
Ravetz was born in Philadelphia; his grandfather was a Russian-Jewish immigrant and his father a truck driver and trade union organiser.  He attended Central High School and Swarthmore College.  He came to England in 1950 on a Fulbright Scholarship to Trinity College, Cambridge, where he studied for a PhD in Pure Mathematics under the supervision of A.S. Besicovitch. In 1955 his passport was taken away, as part of the wave of McCarthyism; it was returned in 1958 and in 1961 he became a British citizen.  He taught mathematics at the University of Pennsylvania and then at Durham University.  In 1957 he moved to the University of Leeds to join Stephen Toulmin in the establishment of a centre in the History and Philosophy of Science.  He stayed at Leeds, eventually becoming a Reader, until taking early retirement in 1983.  Since then he has been an independent scholar.

He has visited at Utrecht University, Harvard University, the Institute for Advanced Study, the University of California, Santa Cruz, Fudan University (Shanghai), the University of Texas at Dallas, the Carnegie Mellon University and the University of Luxembourg. Over the years he has worked closely with colleagues at the European Commission Joint Research Centre, Ispra, Italy.

Ravetz's earliest research, after mathematics, was in the history of the mathematical sciences, with works on Copernicus and Fourier.
In the sixties Ravetz, focused on contradictions in the functioning of science and its image, between a narrative of progress and one of depredation science. He had proposed an unusual approach to study these contradictions. He highlighted the craft character of scientific knowledge, a set of procedures and evaluations that are part of the social activity of science. The quality of research, according to Ravetz, is influenced by this social component of scientific knowledge, which is strongly influenced by the professional models communicated through teaching. Due to this, the standard of adequacy is set by norms culturally stablished and shared.

His influential book Scientific Knowledge and Its Social Problems went through several English language editions, plus German and Japanese translations, and was republished in 1996. This book raises issues of uncertainty and ethics in the social practice of science. It was an early attempt to recast the philosophy of science for the conditions of 'industrialised science' and to shift the philosophy of science from epistemology to the social and ethical aspects of science. In it he proposed a 'critical science' for a new version of the idealism that had characterised science in the pre-industrial age.

In the years around 1970 he was an active member of the British Society for Social Responsibility in Science.

From 1973 to 1976 he was Executive Secretary of the Council for Science and Society in London, whose founder was the law reformer Paul Sieghart. He drafted its report on 'The Acceptability of Risks'.  From 1977 to 1978, he was a member of the Genetic Manipulation Advisory Group, regulating research in recombinant DNA.
Working with Silvio Funtowicz in Leeds  he created the NUSAP notational system, described in their book Uncertainty and Quality in Science for Policy (Reidel 1990). This was the stimulus for the development of the 'Guidance' for managing uncertainty, at the Netherlands Environment Agency. 
They also created the theory of Post-normal science, which applies when 'Facts are uncertain, values in dispute, stakes high and decisions urgent.' A collection of his essays, The merger of knowledge with power: essays in critical science was also published in 1990.  With Zia Sardar he co-authored Cyberfutures: Culture and Politics on the Information Superhighway in 1996.[2] His most recent book is The No nonsense guide to science (New Internationalist 2006).
His research continues in two main directions:   new trends in the social practice of science; and new approaches to the management of uncertainty.  On the former, he has co-authored (with Silvio Funtowicz) chapters on 'Science, New Forms of'  and 'Peer Review and Quality Control' for the International Encyclopedia of Social and Behavioral Sciences (2015).  On the latter he is concerned with the analysis of ignorance and the representation and manipulation of quantitative information where there is 'not even one significant digit'. He has also recently written 
on the quality control crisis of science.

He is currently an Associate Fellow at the Institute for Science, Innovation and Society at the University of Oxford. His research focus is on the impacts of technological progress on science, and new forms of science governance necessary for the protection of society, the environment and science itself.  Ravetz studies new institutional models and collective behaviors that rehabilitate the function of science as a solver of the problem of the sustainability of contemporary material society that derives from the ongoing technological development.
 
He was interviewed by the Great Transition Initiative's blog  in June 2016. On May 31, 2019, the Institute for Science, Innovation and Society in Oxford has devoted a seminar  to honour his 90th birthday. He published a World View piece in the journal Nature on November 19, 2019, entitled Stop the science training that demands ‘don’t ask’. 
Science governance, unknown unknowns, science as a solver of the problem of the sustainability of society are tackled in the context of present debates.  
Together with other scholars, Ravetz has contributed to the debate on the COVID-19 pandemic 
 and use of mathematical models.

Quotes 
"The activity of modern natural science has transformed our knowledge and control of the world about us; but in the process it has also transformed itself; and it has created problems that natural science alone cannot solve". Scientific Knowledge and its Social Problems, Oxford 1971, p. 9.

"Wherever there's a system, there's a racket to beat it." Ibidem, p. 295.

"Any artifact will have: intended use, creative new use, incompetent misuse and malevolent abuse".

Bibliography

See also
 Post-normal science
 American philosophy
 List of American philosophers
 Science wars
 Gaming the system
 Goodhart's Law
 Silvio Funtowicz

References

External links
 'Crisis, what crisis in Science?'
Seminar at the Institute for Science, Innovation and Society, Oxford University, July 30, 2018, hosted by Jerome R. Ravetz with Philip Mirowski and Andrea Saltelli.
 Reflections on ‘informed critical resistance, reform and the making of futures’, Post-Normal Science Symposium in Barcelona: Address by Jerome Ravetz, 15 November 2018.
 Science - post normal perspectivs: Jerry Ravetz at 90, a workshop of the Institute for Science, Innovation and Society to honour Jerome R. Ravetz 90th birthday. May 31st, 2019, Oxford.
 Videos from Science - post normal perspectivs: Jerry Ravetz at 90, a workshop of the Institute for Science, Innovation and Society to honour Jerome R. Ravetz 90th birthday. May 31st, 2019, Oxford., also available as podcast.
 Matt Finch interviews Jerry Ravetz for Mechanical Dolphin: 'Post-normal science in the time of COVID-19: Discussion with Jerome Ravetz', July 13, 2020.
 Welcome to the PNS Movement at PNS5 (post-normal science symposium), Florence, September 21, 2020. See the Symposium program here.

External links 
Guidance for Uncertainty Assessment and Communication, Netherlands Environmental Agency
Jerome Ravetz homepage
Recent articles by Ravetz
Ongoing discussions of Post-Normal Science can be found on the blog 
More articles and excerpts from J. Ravetz's works

1929 births
Living people
20th-century American philosophers
American expatriate academics
Philosophers of science
American expatriates in the United Kingdom
American people of Russian-Jewish descent
British people of Russian-Jewish descent
Central High School (Philadelphia) alumni
Swarthmore College alumni
Alumni of Trinity College, Cambridge
Victims of McCarthyism
University of Pennsylvania faculty
Academics of Durham University
Academics of the University of Leeds
21st-century American mathematicians
British mathematicians
People associated with the University of Oxford
Carnegie Mellon University faculty
Harvard University faculty
Academic staff of Fudan University
Institute for Advanced Study faculty
Academic staff of Utrecht University
Historians of science
Philosophers of mathematics
20th-century American mathematicians
Mathematicians from Pennsylvania
Fulbright alumni